Khurtey (Khürtei) is a rural locality (a settlement) in Kizhinginsky District, Republic of Buryatia, Russia. The population was 859 as of 2010. There are 15 streets.

Geography 
Khurtey is located 78 km east of Kizhinga (the district's administrative centre) by road. Zagustay is the nearest rural locality.

References 

Rural localities in Kizhinginsky District